Isochariesthes eurychroma is a species of beetle in the family Cerambycidae. It was described by Pierre Téocchi in 1990.

References

eurychroma
Beetles described in 1990